Christopher Russell Rouse (born November 28, 1958) is an American film and television editor and screenwriter who has about a dozen feature-film credits and numerous television credits. Rouse won the Academy Award for Best Film Editing, the BAFTA Award for Best Editing, and the ACE Eddie Award for the film The Bourne Ultimatum (2007).

Life and career

Rouse was born in Los Angeles, California. His father, Russell Rouse, was a writer, director and producer. His mother was actress Beverly Michaels. 

In the 1980s, he worked as an assistant editor on numerous films, commencing with All Summer in a Day (1982). His first editing credit was for Desperate Hours (1990), which was directed by Michael Cimino. Much of Rouse's work in the 1990s was in television. He edited the mini-series Anne Frank: The Whole Story (2002) for which he was nominated for an Emmy Award.

Rouse has worked on six films with director Paul Greengrass. The Bourne Supremacy (2004) was their first collaboration. Rouse had previously been an "additional editor" on the initial film in the Bourne series, The Bourne Identity (2002), that had been directed by Doug Liman. Frank Marshall, who co-produced the Bourne series, recommended Rouse to Greengrass. 

The editing of their second feature together, United 93 (2006), received the BAFTA Award as well as nominations for the Academy Award and the ACE Eddie Award. Rouse won the Academy Award, the BAFTA Award, and the ACE Eddie for his third collaboration The Bourne Ultimatum (2007). He edited Greengrass' 2010 film Green Zone.

Several interviews of Rouse have been published where he discusses the editing of Greengrass' films. Greengrass is noted for a "cinéma vérité" style of filmmaking that uses several handheld cameras, and that creates opportunities for innovative editing. Ellen Feldman has written a detailed analysis of the editing of United 93. David Bordwell has discussed this aspect of the films as a further extension of "intensified continuity", which is a perspective on filmmaking that Bordwell has been developing for some years.

Rouse has been elected as a member of the American Cinema Editors.

Filmography

As editor 
 Fast X (Louis Leterrier - 2023, post-production)
 Fast & Furious Presents: Hobbs & Shaw (David Leitch – 2019)
 Jason Bourne (Greengrass – 2016)
 Captain Phillips (Greengrass – 2013)
 Green Zone (Greengrass – 2010)
 The Bourne Ultimatum (Greengrass – 2007)
 United 93 (Greengrass – 2006) With Clare Douglas and Rick Pearson
 Eight Below (Frank Marshall – 2006)
 The Bourne Supremacy (Greengrass – 2004) With Rick Pearson
 Paycheck (John Woo – 2003)
 The Italian Job (F. Gary Gray – 2003) With Richard Francis-Bruce
 The Pennsylvania Miners' Story (2002) (TV)
 Boomtown (2002) (TV series, 1 episode)
 Anne Frank: The Whole Story (Robert Dornhelm – 2001) (TV miniseries)
 A Girl Thing (2001) (TV miniseries)
 Sole Survivor (2000) (TV)
 Aftershock: Earthquake in New York (1999) (TV)
 Olympic Glory (1999)
 From the Earth to the Moon (1998) (miniseries; parts 5, 6, 8 and 10)
 Dead Men Can't Dance (1997)
 Tails You Live, Heads You're Dead (1995) (TV)
 Nothing Personal (1995)
 The Wharf Rat (1995) (TV)
 Breach of Conduct (1994) (TV)
 Dangerous Touch (1994)
 Teresa's Tattoo (1994)
 Past Midnight (Jan Eliasberg – 1991)
 Desperate Hours (Michael Cimino – 1990)

As writer 
 Jason Bourne (2016)

As executive-producer 
 Jennifer Lopez: Halftime (Amanda Micheli – 2022).
 Jason Bourne (Greengrass – 2016).

As co-producer 
 Captain Phillips (Greengrass – 2013).
 Green Zone (Greengrass – 2010).

Awards and nominations
2008
Won: Academy Award for Best Film Editing - The Bourne Ultimatum
Won: BAFTA Film Awards Best Edited Feature Film - The Bourne Ultimatum
Won: ACE Eddie Best Edited Film - Drama - The Bourne Ultimatum
2007
Nominated: Academy Award for Film Editing - United 93
Won: BAFTA Award for Best Editing - United 93
Nominated: ACE Eddie Best Edited Film - Drama - United 93
Won: Online Film Critics Society Award for Best Editing - United 93
2006
 Won: San Diego Film Critics Society Award for Best Editing - United 93
2001
Nominated: Emmy Award - Anne Frank: The Whole Story

See also
List of film director and editor collaborations

References

External links 

1958 births
Living people
American Cinema Editors
American film editors
American male screenwriters
American television editors
Best Editing BAFTA Award winners
Best Film Editing Academy Award winners
Place of birth missing (living people)
People from Los Angeles